The 1979 All-East football team consists of American football players chosen by the Associated Press as the best players at each position among the Eastern colleges and universities during the 1979 NCAA Division I-A football season.

The 1979 Pittsburgh Panthers football team was the only Eastern team to finish in the top ten, ranking No. 6 in the final UPI poll and No. 7 in the final AP poll. Pitt placed five players on the All-Eastern first team: defensive end Hugh Green, offensive tackle Mark May, tight end Benjie Pryor, and defensive backs JoJo Heath and Terry White.

Three of the players who won first-team honors on the All-East team also received first-team honors on the 1979 All-America college football team: wide receiver Art Monk of Syracuse; defensive end Hugh Green of Pitt; and defensive tackle Bruce Clark of Penn State.

Offense

Quarterback
 Bill Hurley, Syracuse (AP-1)

Running backs
 Joe Morris, Syracuse (AP-1)
 Matt Suhey, Penn State (AP-1)

Tight end
 Benjie Pryor, Pitt (AP-1)

Wide receivers
 Gerald Lucear, Temple (AP-1)
 Art Monk, Syracuse (AP-1)

Tackles
 Mark May, Pitt (AP-1)
 Irv Pankey, Penn State (AP-1)

Guards
 Frank McCallister, Navy (AP-1)
 Craig Wolfley, Syracuse (AP-1)

Center
 Bill Chaplick, Boston College (AP-1)

Defense

Ends
 Hugh Green, Pitt (AP-1)
 Charlie Thornton, Navy (AP-1)

Tackles
 Bruce Clark, Penn State (AP-1)
 Dino Mangiero, Rutgers (AP-1)

Middle guard
 George Mayes, Army (AP-1)

Linebackers
 Jim Collins, Syracuse (AP-1)
 Lance Mehl, Penn State (AP-1)
 Tim Tumpane, Yale (AP-1)

Defensive backs 
 JoJo Heath, Pitt (AP-1)
 Bernie Hober, Villanova (AP-1)
 Terry White, Pitt (AP-1)

Key
 AP = Associated Press

See also
 1979 College Football All-America Team

References

All-Eastern
All-Eastern college football teams